Steven Uhrik is an American businessman, luthier and musician.  He is the owner & chief luthier of RetroFret Rare & Vintage Musical Instruments located in Brooklyn, New York City. Steven began his career as an apprentice violin restorer. He opened his first business called "New York String Service" focused on repairs.  The business would slowly progress into a combination service & retail store known as RetroFret.

References

https://www.fretboardjournal.com/podcasts/podcast-362-retrofrets-steve-uhrik-and-peter-kohman-on-paul-bigsby/
https://acousticguitar.com/makers-shakerssteve-uhrik-of-retrofret-vintage-guitars/
https://www.nytimes.com/2012/11/11/nyregion/retrofret-in-gowanus-brooklyn-sells-rare-guitars.html
https://collections.mfa.org/objects/565366/electric-violin;jsessionid=C07AE648252D156D08870A31B2534BE0?ctx=ba6854c2-78ed-4f44-b359-c84449903be4&idx=2

American luthiers
Businesspeople from New York City
21st-century American businesspeople